Tragopogon gorskianus is a species of flowering plant belonging to the family Asteraceae.

Its native range is Lithuania to Belarus.

References

gorskianus